Dhaka International Film Festival is a biennial film festival held in Dhaka, Bangladesh. Established in 1992, the festival was initially organized on annual basis, but became a biennial event since 1995. DIFF is one of the most prestigious film events in Bangladesh, dedicated to introduce the mainstream global cinema to the local film makers as well as to promote healthy cine culture within Bangladesh. The festival was founded by Ahmed Muztaba Zamal of the Rainbow Film Society, which has, as of 2022, organized 20 editions of the event bringing international recognition to it.

Awards
The festival authority chooses and invites Asian and Australian films to participate in different sections. The sections are:
 Retrospective
 Cinema of the World
 Women Filmmakers
 Children's Film
 Short and Independent
 Spiritual Films

The festival is devoted to feature films only. Documentary and short films may only be included in Women Filmmaker, Short and Independent, Spiritual Films and in other special sections where it is deemed fit.  A five-member independent international jury board adjudicate the Asian competition section. The international jury committee select one Best Film, Best Director, Best Actor, Best Actress, Best Script and Best Cinematographer. These awards consist of a crest and certificate.  The Best Film award carries a cash prize of Tk 100,000.

Awards ceremonies
The following is a listing of all Dhaka International Film Awards ceremonies since 1992.

See also
 Dhaka Festival
 Cinemaking International Film Festival
 Kolkata International Film Festival
 Hyderabad Bengali Film Festival
 National Film Awards (Bangladesh)
 Meril Prothom Alo Awards
 Babisas Award
 Ifad Film Club Award

References

External links
 www.dhakafilmfestival.org Official Website
 

Film festivals in Bangladesh
Film festivals established in 1992
Cultural festivals in Dhaka